The Church of St Julian in Wellow, Somerset, England has origins before the 12th century although the present building dates from 1372. It has been designated as a Grade I listed building.

History

The church is believed to have Roman origins in connection with a local villa and the dedication to Julian the Hospitaller may support this claim. A statue of St Julian holding an oar is displayed in a niche above the porch. It is known that Wellow was granted to monastery of St. Andrew at Wells, now Wells Cathedral, in 766 by the King of the West Saxons. In 1117 it was given, along with Frome to an order of Augustinian Canons at Cirencester (now Cirencester Abbey by Henry I. This affiliation is confirmed by a charter signed by Edward III in 1337. In 1369 Sir Thomas Hungerford bought Wellow and rebuilt the church which was consecrated on May Day in 1372 by John Harewell, Bishop of Bath and Wells.

Services
Part of the wider benefice of The St J's Group including Peasedown St. John and Foxcote with Shoscombe. Church services occur each Sunday at 10am with refreshments afterwards. The first Sunday of the month is an all age worship service and Holy Communion occur on the 2nd Sunday of the month.

See more via the website at www.stjsgroup.church.

Architecture

The Porch has a 14th-century oak door. The east end of the south aisle bears a scratch dial of a Sundial. The octagonal south rood stair turret dates from around 1450 however most of the chancel is from a 19th-century refurbishment. The nave includes a clerestory which was added around the middle of the 15th century along with the Rood Screen. The font dates from around 1250 but has undergone several restorations. The Hungerford Chapel contains 15th century wall paintings of Christ and the twelve apostles dating from the 15th century and several monuments to the Hungerford family.

There is an embattled parapet with pinnacles. The square stair turret on the south-east corner terminates as an octagon. There is a three-light window to the bell chamber with cusped heads and a similar but larger window with transom to west.

See also

 List of Grade I listed buildings in Bath and North East Somerset
 List of towers in Somerset
 List of ecclesiastical parishes in the Diocese of Bath and Wells

References

Buildings and structures completed in 1372
Grade I listed churches in Somerset
Church of England church buildings in Bath and North East Somerset
Grade I listed buildings in Bath and North East Somerset